The women's 400 metres at the 2022 European Athletics Championships took place at the Olympiastadion on 15, 16 and 17 August.

Records

Schedule

Results

Round 1
First 3 in each heat (Q) and the next 3 fastest  (q) advance to the Semifinals. The 12 highest ranked athletes received a bye into the semi-finals

Semifinals
First 2 in each semifinal (Q) and the next 2 fastest (q) advance to the Final.

Final

References

400 W
400 metres at the European Athletics Championships
Euro